Nobitz is a municipality in the district Altenburger Land, in Thuringia, Germany. The nearby Nobitz airfield was used by Ryanair for flights to and from London Stansted between 2003 and 2011.

History
Within the German Empire (1871–1918), Nobitz was part of the Duchy of Saxe-Altenburg. In East Germany, it was part of Bezirk Leipzig. In July 2018 the former municipalities of Frohnsdorf, Jückelberg and Ziegelheim were merged into Nobitz.

References

Altenburger Land
Duchy of Saxe-Altenburg